Xestia ursae is a species of cutworm or dart moth in the family Noctuidae.

The MONA or Hodges number for Xestia ursae is 10966.1.

References

Further reading

 
 
 

Xestia
Articles created by Qbugbot
Moths described in 1940